Kōrimoto Station is the name of two train stations in Kagoshima City, Kagoshima Prefecture, Japan:

 Kōrimoto Station (JR Kyushu)
 Kōrimoto Station (Kagoshima City Tram)